Andrew Bradley may refer to:

A. C. Bradley (Andrew Cecil Bradley, 1851–1935), English literary scholar
Andrew Coyle Bradley (1844–1902), US federal judge
Andrew M. Bradley (1906–1983), American cabinet secretary in the Commonwealth of Pennsylvania
Quro, born Andrew Bradley, Australian hip hop MC from Adelaide, South Australia